Paul Broadie II (born April 18, 1968) is an American college president.

Broadie received his Ph.D. from Colorado State University, a master in business administration degree from Long Island University, and a bachelor of science degree in business administration from Mercy College (New York).

He served as the president of both Housatonic Community College (Bridgeport, Connecticut) and Gateway Community College (New Haven, Connecticut).  In 2018, he was named by the NAACP as one of the "100 Most Influential Blacks in Connecticut".

On October 4, 2019, Santa Fe College (Gainesville, Florida) announced that Broadie was selected as its new president, following the retirement of its former president Dr. Jackson Sasser.  Broadie became the fifth president in the college's 54-year history.  He commenced his duties at Santa Fe College in February 2020.

References 

1968 births
Living people
Colorado State University alumni
Heads of universities and colleges in the United States
Long Island University alumni
Mercy College (New York) alumni
Place of birth missing (living people)